William Fosse was a lawyer and the member of Parliament for Great Grimsby in 1407 and 1411. He served six terms as the mayor of the town.

References 

Year of birth missing
Year of death missing
Mayors of Grimsby
English lawyers
English MPs 1407
Members of the Parliament of England for Great Grimsby
English MPs 1411